Bernhard Eisel (born 17 February 1981) is an Austrian former professional road bicycle racer, who rode professionally between 2001 and 2019 for the , , ,  and  teams. Following his retirement, he worked as an analyst and presenter for Eurosport and the Global Cycling Network (GCN), before joining  as a directeur sportif in 2022.

Career
Born in Voitsberg, Eisel won his first race when he was 11 years old, since then he has won many races. When he was 17, he moved to Italy to race for the team Rinascita Ormelle, based in Treviso. After that he moved to Gli Amici Piave, the team of Moreno Argentin. In 2001 he joined the team  and became a professional cyclist, from 2003 on he joined .

Eisel enjoyed a successful first season with his main victory coming on Stage 2 of the Volta ao Algarve. Eisel established himself as the right-hand man of sprinter and teammate Mark Cavendish, protecting him throughout the flats and mountain stages and forming part of the HTC lead out train that saw Cavendish take many notable victories in the Tour de France and other races. Eisel also had opportunities to ride for himself, mainly in the classics. He won Paris–Bourges in 2008 and Gent–Wevelgem in 2010, and in 2011, Eisel recorded his best placing in a monument by finishing seventh in Paris–Roubaix. Eisel was appointed as a member of the inaugural UCI Athletes' Commission in 2011.

On 28 September 2015, Sky announced that Eisel would be among the riders leaving the team at the end of the year, following four seasons with the team.

On 14 January 2020 he announced his retirement from professional racing. Shortly afterwards he took up a role as a presenter, reporter and commentator for Eurosport and Global Cycling Network (GCN). In November 2021  announced that Eisel would join them as a directeur sportif from the 2022 season.

Major results

1999
 5th Road race, UCI Junior Road World Championships
2002
 1st Radclassic-Gleisdorf
 2nd Overall Paris–Corrèze
 4th Overall GP Erik Breukink
2003
 1st Stage 4 Tour du Limousin
 3rd Overall GP Erik Breukink
1st Stage 2
 7th Overall Circuit Franco-Belge
2004
 1st Stage 3 Criterium des Espoirs
 1st Bad Ischl
 5th Scheldeprijs
 7th Overall Tour de Picardie
2005
 Volta ao Algarve
1st  Points classification
1st Stages 1 & 4
 1st Stage 1 Tour de Suisse
 2nd Overall Grande Prémio Internacional Costa Azul
1st Points classification
1st Stage 4
2006
 1st Stage 4 Tour of Qatar
 1st Stage 2 Volta ao Algarve
 1st Grazer Altstadt Kriterium
 1st Mayrhofen Europa-Kriterium
 2nd Overall Three Days of De Panne
1st  Points classification
1st Stage 2a
 2nd Overall Grande Prémio Internacional Costa Azul
 5th Paris–Roubaix
 7th Gent–Wevelgem
2007
 1st Lancaster Classic
 1st Reading Classic
 1st Stage 2 Volta ao Algarve
 1st Linz criterium
 3rd Philadelphia International Championship
 4th Overall Tour of Qatar
 8th Trofeo Palma
2008
 1st Paris–Bourges
 1st Stage 5 Volta ao Algarve
 3rd Reading Classic
 4th Philadelphia International Championship
 6th E3 Prijs Vlaanderen
 9th Lancaster Classic
2009
 1st Stage 2 Tour de Suisse
 1st Welser Sparkassen Innenstadt-Kriterium
 2nd Kuurne–Brussels–Kuurne
 3rd Road race, National Road Championships
 9th Scheldeprijs
2010
 1st Gent–Wevelgem
 1st Stage 1 (TTT) Vuelta a España
 7th Paris–Bourges
 8th Omloop Het Nieuwsblad
 9th Paris–Tours
2011
 7th Paris–Roubaix
 7th Gent–Wevelgem
 8th Overall Tour of Qatar
2012
 3rd E3 Harelbeke
2013
 5th Overall Tour of Qatar
 7th Gent–Wevelgem
 10th Milan–San Remo
2014
 3rd Road race, National Road Championships
2017
 1st  Mountains classification Arctic Race of Norway

Grand Tour general classification results timeline

References

External links

 

 Bernhard Eisel profile at Team Sky

1981 births
Living people
Austrian male cyclists
Cyclists at the 2004 Summer Olympics
Cyclists at the 2012 Summer Olympics
Olympic cyclists of Austria
Tour de Suisse stage winners
People from Voitsberg
Cycling announcers
Directeur sportifs
Sportspeople from Styria